Philodice may refer to:

 Philodice (mythology)
 Philodice (bird), a genus of hummingbirds
 Philodice (plant) a genus of flowering plants in the family Eriocaulaceae
 Colias philodice, a species of butterfly